Apache Cat (foaled 2002) is an Australian Thoroughbred racehorse who had 43 starts for 19 wins (including eight Group One (G1) victories) and was placed on another 11 occasions from for just under $4.6 million in prize money. He was born and bred at Chatswood Stud in Victoria.

He is a strikingly marked, baldy faced, chestnut gelding by the shuttle stallion, Lion Cavern (USA) from Tennessee Blaze by Whiskey Road (USA). Apache Cat was bred by Mr P.F. Radford and Ms R Lawrie of Victoria.

Racing record
In May 2008, Apache Cat scored his fourth and fifth consecutive Group One wins in the BTC Cup and in the Doomben 10,000 respectively at Doomben Racecourse in Brisbane, Queensland.

Apache Cat’s other Group One victories in this winning streak were Lightning Stakes at Flemington in 2008, Australia Stakes at Moonee Valley in 2008 and T J Smith Stakes at Randwick in 2008. He also won the 2006 Cadbury Guineas. Apache Cat's Group 1 streak matched the record set by T.J. Smith's champion Tulloch, Who was the last horse to win five majors in succession by claiming the Rosehill Guineas, AJC Derby, Caulfield Guineas, Caulfield Cup and Victoria Derby in 1957. Apache Cat was ridden by jockey Corey Brown in all five Group One victories of 2008, who rated the star sprinter the best he has ridden in his career.

After four defeats (two unplaced) to start his 2008/09 season, Apache Cat bounced back to form in February 2009 to win his seventh Group One in the Australia Stakes. At his next race start Apache Cat finished third behind Takeover Target in the Group One T J Smith Stakes at Randwick racecourse.

On 9 May 2009, Apache Cat lost no admirers when he just failed to record a second successive win in the weight-for-age BTC Cup event. Two weeks later, the sprinter etched his name into turf history after scoring back-to-back Doomben 10,000 wins at Doomben Racecourse. Apart from his eight G1 victories, he won four Group Two races, four Group Threes and two Listed races.

Retirement 
On 16 December 2009 trainer Greg Eurell retired Apache Cat after the horse sustained a leg fracture during the running of the 2009 Cathay Pacific Hong Kong Sprint at Sha Tin racecourse, Hong Kong, China.

Apache Cat now lives at Living Legends horse retirement home in Melbourne, with other champion racehorses such as Bomber Bill and Sky Heights.

References

 2008 BTC Cup Win
 2008 Doomben 10,000 Win
 Apache Cat pedigree
 
 
 
 
 2009 Doomben 10,000 Win

2002 racehorse births
Racehorses bred in Australia
Racehorses trained in Australia
Thoroughbred family 4-d